Ngaumutawa is a suburb of Masterton, New Zealand.

Ngaumutawa is a Māori language word meaning an oven of the tawa tree. Ngaumutawa was a Māori village or pā in 1853. The Native Land Court assigned title to the land in 1866, and most was sold to pākehā settlers by the end of the decade. Ngaumutawa Road was created about 1904. The area was still rural in 1973 but was under development in 1980.

The rural area southeast of Ngaumutawa is marked as a "Future Development Area" by the Masterton District Council. The plan was criticised for not explicitly including provision for affordable housing.

Demographics 

Ngaumutawa had a population of 1,491 at the 2018 New Zealand census, an increase of 114 people (8.3%) since the 2013 census, and an increase of 111 people (8.0%) since the 2006 census. There were 654 households. There were 681 males and 810 females, giving a sex ratio of 0.84 males per female. The median age was 46.6 years (compared with 37.4 years nationally), with 270 people (18.1%) aged under 15 years, 228 (15.3%) aged 15 to 29, 585 (39.2%) aged 30 to 64, and 408 (27.4%) aged 65 or older.

Ethnicities were 87.3% European/Pākehā, 19.9% Māori, 3.0% Pacific peoples, 2.6% Asian, and 1.2% other ethnicities (totals add to more than 100% since people could identify with multiple ethnicities).

The proportion of people born overseas was 11.9%, compared with 27.1% nationally.

Although some people objected to giving their religion, 49.3% had no religion, 40.0% were Christian, 0.8% were Hindu, 0.2% were Buddhist and 2.2% had other religions.

Of those at least 15 years old, 129 (10.6%) people had a bachelor or higher degree, and 339 (27.8%) people had no formal qualifications. The median income was $27,200, compared with $31,800 nationally. The employment status of those at least 15 was that 510 (41.8%) people were employed full-time, 174 (14.3%) were part-time, and 27 (2.2%) were unemployed.

References

Suburbs of Masterton